KNKR-LP (96.1 FM) is a community radio station licensed to Hawi, Hawaii. The station is owned by Kohala Radio and airs a variety radio format.

The station was assigned the KNKR-LP call letters by the Federal Communications Commission on March 10, 2014.

References

External links
 Official Website
 

NKR-LP
NKR-LP
Radio stations established in 2015
Community radio stations in the United States
Variety radio stations in the United States
2015 establishments in Hawaii
Hawaii County, Hawaii